Something Special is the fifth studio album by American country music artist George Strait, released on August 29, 1985 by MCA Records. It is certified platinum by the RIAA. The album produced singles in the track "You're Something Special to Me" (#4 on Hot Country Singles) and "The Chair" (#1 on the same chart). It was the first album for the MCA label to be issued on both LP album and compact disc.  "Blue is Not a Word" was previously recorded by Kari Pickett in 1978.

Track listing

Personnel
George Strait – lead vocals
Curtis "Mr. Harmony" Young – background vocals
Paul Franklin – pedal steel guitar
David Hungate – bass guitar
John Hobbs – keyboards
Richard Bennett – acoustic guitar
Dean Parks – acoustic guitar
Billy Joe Walker Jr. – electric guitar
Reggie Young – electric guitar
Johnny Gimble – fiddle
Matt Betton – drums

Production
Ron Treat – engineer
Bob Bullock – engineer
Mark Coddington – engineer
Russ Martin – engineer
Tim Kish – engineer
Chuck Ainlay – mixer
Peter Brill Nash – photography
Simon Levy – art director
Brown – design and production

Charts

Weekly charts

Year-end charts

References

1985 albums
George Strait albums
MCA Records albums
Albums produced by Jimmy Bowen